Alicyclobacillus acidiphilus is a thermo-acidophilic, omega-alicyclic fatty acid-containing bacterium. It's aerobic, gram-positive, spore-forming and rod-shaped, with type strain TA-67T (= DSM 14558T = IAM 14935T = NRIC 6496T).

The optimum growth temperature for A. acidiphilus is 50 °C, and can grow in the 20-55 °C range. The optimum pH is 3.0, and can grow in pH 2.5-5.5.

References

Further reading

Yokota, A., T. Fujii, and K. Goto. "Alicyclobacillus." (2007).

External links

LPSN
Type strain of Alicyclobacillus acidiphilus at BacDive -  the Bacterial Diversity Metadatabase

Bacillales
Thermophiles
Bacteria described in 2002